Anthrenoides is a genus of bees belonging to the family Andrenidae.

The species of this genus are found in Southern America.

Species:

Anthrenoides admirabilis 
Anthrenoides affinis 
Anthrenoides albinoi 
Anthrenoides alineae 
Anthrenoides alvarengai 
Anthrenoides antonii 
Anthrenoides araucariae 
Anthrenoides atriventris 
Anthrenoides birgitae 
Anthrenoides bocainensis 
Anthrenoides caatingae 
Anthrenoides calderensis 
Anthrenoides cearensis 
Anthrenoides cordobensis 
Anthrenoides corrugatus 
Anthrenoides cyphomandrae 
Anthrenoides deborae 
Anthrenoides densopunctatus 
Anthrenoides digitatus 
Anthrenoides elegantulus 
Anthrenoides elioi 
Anthrenoides falsificus 
Anthrenoides faviziae 
Anthrenoides flavomaculatus 
Anthrenoides francisci 
Anthrenoides gibberosus 
Anthrenoides gibbosus 
Anthrenoides glossatus 
Anthrenoides guarapuavae 
Anthrenoides guttulatus 
Anthrenoides jordanensis 
Anthrenoides kelliae 
Anthrenoides labratus 
Anthrenoides langei 
Anthrenoides larocai 
Anthrenoides lavrensis 
Anthrenoides magaliae 
Anthrenoides meloi 
Anthrenoides meridionalis 
Anthrenoides micans 
Anthrenoides neffi 
Anthrenoides nigrinasis 
Anthrenoides nordestinus 
Anthrenoides ornatus 
Anthrenoides palmeirae 
Anthrenoides paolae 
Anthrenoides paranaensis 
Anthrenoides paulensis 
Anthrenoides petrolinensis 
Anthrenoides petuniae 
Anthrenoides pinhalensis 
Anthrenoides politus 
Anthrenoides reticulatus 
Anthrenoides rodrigoi 
Anthrenoides saltensis 
Anthrenoides sanpedroi 
Anthrenoides santiagoi 
Anthrenoides serranicola 
Anthrenoides sidiae 
Anthrenoides sulinus 
Anthrenoides tucumanus 
Anthrenoides villaguayensis 
Anthrenoides zanellai

References

Andrenidae